Titanic: The Complete Story is an American documentary chronicling the story of the ocean liner  which sank on its maiden voyage in 1912. It is a compilation of a four-hour documentary special produced by A&E Television Networks in 1994. A&E Home Video originally sold the entire documentary in a 4-tape VHS set and later a DVD release. It is considered by many critics and historians to be the definitive documentary regarding the Titanic. It is most famous for being one of the few Titanic documentaries to feature survivors.

The documentary
The documentary is narrated by actor David McCallum (who played survivor Harold Bride in the 1958 film A Night to Remember) and begins with a quote from first-class passenger Jack Thayer, about how the world's mindset was forever altered by the sinking. Rare interviews with some of the few remaining Titanic survivors, including Edith Brown, Eva Hart, Ruth Becker (who had already died in 1990), Millvina Dean, and Michel Marcel Navratil; discussions with leading historical authorities on the sinking, including Charles Haas, John Eaton, Ken Marschall, Don Lynch and Robert Ballard; and excerpts from survivor's writings and newspaper articles accompany McCallum's telling of the story.

The documentary is presented in two parts:

Titanic: Death of a Dream
The first half, Titanic: Death of a Dream, encapsulates the first two hours. It tells the story of the RMS Titanics origins, from its conception and construction, to its maiden voyage, leading up to the initial collision with the iceberg that would ultimately sink the ship.

Titanic: The Legend Lives On
The second half, Titanic: The Legend Lives On, concentrates on the ship's sinking, its immediate aftermath, and its discovery in 1985 by Dr. Robert Ballard, along with Titanics continuing legacy.

Cast
 David McCallum as Narrator
 Millvina Dean		...	Titanic survivor
 Edith Haisman		...	Titanic survivor
 Dot Kendle	...	Daughter of Edith Brown Haisman
 Eva Hart			...	Titanic survivor
 Ruth Becker Blanchard	...	Titanic survivor
 Wyn Wade			...	Author
 Michael McCaughan		...	Ulster Folk and Transport Museum (curator of maritime history)
 Walter Lord		...	Author
 Ken Marschall		...	Historian, artist
 John P. Eaton			...	Author
 Charles A. Haas		...	Author
 Frances John Parkinson Jr.	...	Son of Titanic woodworker
 Don Lynch	       		...	Historian, author
 Donald Hyslop			...	First Southampton City Council (senior oral historian)
 Brian Ticehurst		...	British Titanic Society
 Edward S. Kamuda		...	Titanic Historical Society (founder and president)
 George Behe			...	Titanic Historical Society (vice-president), historian, author
 Michel 'Momon' Navratil	...	Titanic survivor
 Leslie Harrison		...	Author
 Stanley Tutton Lord		...	Son of Stanley Phillip Lord, captain of SS Californian
 Dr. Robert Ballard	...	Woods Hole Oceanographic Institution, Center for Marine Exploration (director)
 Jean-Louise Michel	...    IFREMER (engineer)
 Arnie Geller			...     RMS Titanic, Inc.
 George Tulloch		...     RMS Titanic, Inc.
 Paul-Henri Nargeoleet	...     IFREMER (commander)
 Dr. Stephen Deucher		...     National Maritime Museum (head of exhibitions)

Reception
The film received a positive review from DVD Magazine.

Awards and nominations
 1995, Nominated for 1995 CableACE Award for "Editing a Documentary Special or Series" 
 1994, Won News & Documentary Emmy Awards 1994 for "Outstanding Achievement in a Craft in News and Documentary Programming"

References

External links 
 History of the Titanic Official website at historyofthetitanic.org
 Original release title: Titanic: Death of a Dream at Internet Movie Database

Documentary films about RMS Titanic
American documentary television films
Documentary films about disasters
1994 American television series debuts
1990s English-language films
1990s American films